Garth and Bev is an Irish television series for preschoolers produced by Kavaleer Productions and broadcast on RTÉ, CBeebies, TVOKids, and BBC2. It was first broadcast on RTÉ Two on 11 January 2010.

Plot
Garth and Bev is set in the Bronze Age and centres on the adventures of Garth and his little sister Bev. Garth and Bev are no ordinary children, though; they are also time travellers. With the help of their grandfather, a mystical druid with magical abilities, they travel through time and learn how nature has influenced modern day inventions.

Themes
Garth & Bev is all about using creativity and problem solving, and these are things that Garth and Bev do in each episode. The show also has an emphasis on the wonderment of nature, suggesting that, more often than not, for every modern invention, nature already has an answer.

Characters
Garth is eight and has always been a great artist, cave drawing from an early age. His other passion in inventing, as well as meeting inventors and learning from them. Bev is six, and very sharp for her age. She loves time travelling with Garth, and will often be the first to discover the solution to Grandfather Lír's challenge. Lír is Garth and Bev's grandfather. He is a wise druid with magical abilities. Lír sets his grandchildren challenges and treats them with an adventure through time if they get it right and discover something new.

References

External links

 Kavaleer productions
 Garth and Bev on IMDb
 Garth and Bev on BBC

2010s British children's television series
Fictional explorers
British children's animated adventure television series
British children's animated science fantasy television series
Irish children's animated adventure television series
Irish children's animated science fantasy television series
British preschool education television series
British time travel television series
2010s British animated television series
2010 Irish television series debuts
2010 British television series debuts
2010 British television series endings
2010 Irish television series endings
CBeebies
Animated preschool education television series
2010s preschool education television series
Animated television series about children
English-language television shows